Cezary Zamana (born 14 November 1967 in Ełk, Poland) is a former professional road racing cyclist from Ełk, Poland.

Major results

1989
 5th Overall Tour de Pologne
1992
 1st Overall Cascade Cycling Classic
1st Stage 3
 1st Stage 5 West Virginia Mountain Classic
 4th Japan Cup Cycle Road Race
 8th Overall Tour of Britain
 9th Giro dell'Emilia
1993
 1st Stage 7 Critérium du Dauphiné Libéré
 3rd Overall Tour d'Armorique
 9th Overall Tour de Pologne
1st Stages 6 & 11
 9th Overall Grand Prix du Midi Libre
1994
 4th Overall Tour d'Armorique
 9th A Travers le Morbihan
1996
 1st Stage 3 Bałtyk–Karkonosze Tour
 5th Overall Tour de Normandie
1st Stage 3
 8th Cholet-Pays de Loire
1997
 3rd Overall Tour de Normandie
1st Stage 2
 3rd Zellik–Galmaarden
 10th Overall Tour of Japan
1998
 1st Overall Commonwealth Bank Classic
 1st Andrzej Kaczyny Memorial
 3rd Road race, National Road Championships
 3rd First Union Invitational
 5th Overall Tour de Slovénie
 5th Overall Course de Solidarność et des Champions Olympiques
 7th Route Adélie
 10th Overall Tour of Japan
1999
 1st  Road race, National Road Championships
 1st Memoriał Henryka Łasaka
 1st Stages 1, 6 & 7 Vuelta a Argentina
 2nd Overall Tour de Pologne
 7th Overall Course de Solidarność et des Champions Olympiques
2000
 1st Overall Szlakiem Walk Majora Hubala
 4th Memoriał Henryka Łasaka
 9th Overall Tour de Pologne
2001
 4th Road race, National Road Championships
2002
 1st Memoriał Henryka Łasaka
 2nd GP Midtbank
 3rd Overall Inter. Race 4 Asy Fiata Autopoland
1st Stage 4
 5th Overall Szlakiem Walk Majora Hubala
 6th Overall Tour de Pologne
1st Stage 6
 8th GP Industria Artigianato e Commercio Carnaghese
 9th GP Fred Mengoni
2003
 1st  Overall Tour de Pologne
1st Stage 6
 1st  Overall Tour of Małopolska
1st Stages 1 & 2
 1st Memoriał Henryka Łasaka
 2nd Overall Okolo Slovenska
1st Stage 2
 5th Road race, National Road Championships
 7th Overall Szlakiem Walk Majora Hubala
2004
 3rd Grand Prix d'Isbergues
 9th Overall Tour de Pologne
2005
 1st Majowy Wyścig Klasyczny-Lublin
 1st  Overall Tour of Małopolska
 1st  Overall Hessen Rundfahrt
 2nd Overall Bałtyk–Karkonosze Tour
 4th Overall Szlakiem Grodów Piastowskich
1st Mountains classification
 4th Ronde van Drenthe
 4th Druivenkoers Overijse
 7th Rund um den Henninger Turm
 7th Overall Giro del Capo
 9th Puchar Ministra Obrony Narodowej
 10th Overall Rheinland-Pfalz Rundfahrt
2006
 8th Druivenkoers Overijse
 10th Overall Tour of Małopolska

External links

1967 births
Living people
People from Augustów
Polish male cyclists
Sportspeople from Podlaskie Voivodeship